Stenalia oligocenica is a beetle in the genus Stenalia of the family Mordellidae. It was described in 1985 by Nel.

References

oligocenica
Beetles described in 1985